Plearnpichaya Komalarajun (Thai: เพลินพิชญา โกมลารชุน), better known as Juné (จูเน่), is a former member of Team BIII of BNK48 from Thailand of the Thai generation. She is also an actress known for her role as Lynn in Bad Genius: The Series.

Personal life
Komalarajun was born on 4 July 2000 in Bangkok, Thailand, she was first known as "Pam", later renamed Juné, she is the second daughter of Paula Bharawan Aphithanaku- CEO of a company, while her mother is the owner of a chain of famous nationwide bread shops. Beside her great family background, June also can speak many foreign languages including Thai, Russian and English, she learned Russian by being an exchange student at AFS Intercultural Programs.

Career
She started her career at the Young Model Contest 2013, but did not win. In 2018, she joined the group BNK48 as a trainee, then was promoted to Team BIII 1 year later, performing at BNK48 Campus. In 2019, at the Senbatsu Sousenkyo general election for her 6th single, she placed 31st overall & appeared in the single "Beginner" with the song "Kimi no Koto ga Suki Dakara". In 2020, at the Senbatsu Sousenkyo general election for her 9th single, she ranked 15th overall & was a senbatsu in the main track of her 9th single- Heavy Rotation

She also starred in the movie The Sun, then One Year: The Series, and also appeared in the group's documentary BNK48: One Take. On June 11, 2020, she announced her graduation, through a live mobile session, to focus on acting, however she will still be a solo artist under the management of Independent Artist Management (iAM).

Then she played the role of Lynn in Bad Genius: The Series, to get the female lead Lynn, she had to compete to cast this role, fortunately she was the one who caught the eye of the director Pat Boonnitipat. When starting to make the first scenes, June encountered many difficulties when she could not convey the content of the script. During filming, Juné had to work very hard to fulfill her role well. When the series closed, director Pat Boonnitipat commented that Juné was the one who did the best out of the 4 main actors of the series.

She left BNK48 on 11 June 2020 to focus on her studies and her acting career.

Works

TV series

Filmography

References

2000 births
Living people
Plearnpichaya Komalarajun
Plearnpichaya Komalarajun
Plearnpichaya Komalarajun